The SM Mall of Asia Arena, also known as the Mall of Asia Arena or the MoA Arena, is an indoor arena within the SM Mall of Asia complex, in Bay City, Pasay, Metro Manila, Philippines. It has a seating capacity of 15,000 for sporting events, and a full house capacity of 20,000. The Arena officially opened on May 21, 2012. It has retractable seats and a 2,000-capacity car park building.

The SM Mall of Asia Arena is the alternate venue of the Philippine Basketball Association when the Smart Araneta Coliseum in Quezon City is unavailable. The arena is also one of the main venues for the University Athletic Association of the Philippines and the National Collegiate Athletic Association.

History
The venue is part of the master plan for the SM Mall of Asia complex which in 2012 already had the SMX Convention Center and the One E-com and Two E-com office buildings.

The arena had its topping-off ceremony in September 2011 and was opened about two years later after it broke ground. The first public event hosted at the indoor arena was the two-night Born This Way Ball concert of Lady Gaga which began on May 21, 2012. A separate event was held as part of the grand opening ceremony of the indoor arena held on June 16, 2012; the Icons at the Arena: Masters of OPM which featured various local musicians and singers which was organized by Star Events of ABS-CBN, directed by Johnny Manahan with Ryan Cayabyab as the concert's musical director.

Architecture and design
The SM Mall of Asia Arena was designed by architecture firm Arquitectonica. The facility was intended primarily as a venue for concert and basketball games but can be reconfigured to accommodate other sporting and entertainment events as well. It has a seating capacity of 15,000 but can host as much as 20,000 people in a full-house capacity.

The limited area of the site meant that part of the building to span over the adjacent Pacific Drive. Due to a high water table, the construction of basement parking levels was limited and a separate eight-storey parking building called Mall of Asia Arena Annex (MAAX) which can accommodate 1,400 vehicles had to be built. The façade of the building are covered with low-e coated and fritted insulated glass units.

The structure hosting the events space was designed in a form of an eye which was supported by a slanted podium plinth.

Facilities
The indoor arena hosts the Premiere Suites which is reportedly the first luxury box in Southeast Asia. The luxury box has a total of 41 suites. A private restaurant, the Premiere Café + Lounge, serves patrons of the luxury box.

Notable events

Entertainment events

Lady Gaga held the first concerts at the arena, selling out her two-night Born This Way Ball tour on May 21–22, 2012. Regine Velasquez was the first Filipino artist to stage a solo concert; she is also the only Filipino artist to stage a two-night, sold-out solo concert at the arena and has performed more times than any other artist. Several other international artists have performed at the arena. In 2015, Darren Espanto became the youngest artist to hold a solo show at the arena at age 14. During its time, Madonna's Rebel Heart Tour concerts on February 24–25, 2016 were the most expensive concerts in the Philippines with ticket costs ranging from ₱3,150 to ₱57,750 per person. One Ok Rock was the first Japanese artist to headline a show in the arena, while EXO was the first Korean artist to stage a two-day sold-out concert series in the arena, followed by other K-pop groups such as Big Bang, Blackpink, 2NE1, Winner, iKON, AKMU, Treasure.

On February 22, 2015, ABS-CBN's ASAP celebrated their 20th Anniversary celebration at the arena. Months later, on July 26, 2015, GMA Network celebrated its 65th Anniversary through a fans' day entitled "Thank You, Kapuso!" held at the arena.

Celine Dion, who performed at the arena on July 19 and 20, 2018, as part of her Celine Dion Live 2018 tour, is the venue's highest-grossing female artist with nearly $4,000,000 between the two shows.

Two of the Big Four international beauty pageants have been held in the arena: Miss Earth 2016 on October 29, 2016, Miss Universe 2016 on January 30, 2017, Miss Earth 2017 on November 4, 2017, and Miss Earth 2018 on November 3, 2018. Additionally, Eat Bulaga!'''s grand coronation day of Miss Millennial Philippines 2017 was also held at the arena on September 30 of that year.

Since 2016, the arena has hosted Disney on Ice productions every December.

The arena hosted the third edition, and will host the fourth edition of the Miss Universe Philippines pageant, on April 30, 2022 and May 13, 2023 respectively.

Sports events

The SM Mall of Asia Arena serves as one of the playing venues of the Philippine Basketball Association (PBA), National Collegiate Athletic Association (Philippines), UAAP and the Premier Volleyball League (PVL).  The venue uses NBA-specification shot clocks, with Daktronics BB-2140 and BB-2141 shot clocks (used by the NBA along with models from OES until the 2016–17 NBA season due to the NBA using Tissot ones) that count tenths in the final five seconds, though recently it has been stretched to the final nine seconds.

The PBA's B-Meg Llamados and the Talk 'N Text Tropang Texters played the first basketball game at the arena on July 7, 2012, as part of the 2012 PBA Governors Cup semifinals. The UAAP's 2012 opening game between the NU Bulldogs and UE Red Warriors on July 14, 2012, was the arena's first college basketball game. The first game of the 2012 UAAP basketball finals was played at the arena in front of 20,686 people.

The PBA's first doubleheader in the arena on October 17, 2012, was marked by a looting incident at the Meralco Bolts' locker room. A day later, the arena hosted the National Collegiate Athletic Association's first game of its finals series against the San Beda Red Lions and the Letran Knights.

On March 6, 2013, the DLSU Lady Spikers became the first team in any Philippine sports to celebrate the first-ever championship in the arena in front of an 18,779 cheering crowd, when they won the UAAP women's volleyball championship.

The SM Mall of Asia Arena served as the main venue for the 2013 FIBA Asia Championship while the Ninoy Aquino Stadium was the second venue for the tournament, which was held on August 1–11, 2013. It had a 19,989 attendance at the final game between the host Philippines and Iran.

The NBA played their first preseason game in Southeast Asia and in the Philippines at this arena on October 10, 2013, featuring the Houston Rockets versus the Indiana Pacers.

The Manila Mavericks of the International Premier Tennis League played their home matches in the arena in the league's inaugural season. The matches were played on November 28–30, 2014.

The UFC held their first event in the Philippines on May 16, 2015, with UFC Fight Night: Edgar vs. Faber.

In June 2015, the Monster Jam motorsport event performed at the arena.

The SM Mall of Asia Arena was one of the three main venues of the 2016 FIBA World Olympic Qualifying Tournaments for Men, which was held in the Philippines, Italy, and Serbia from July 4–10, 2016. This is the second FIBA tournament held at the arena

On October 9, 2017, the Ateneo Lady Eagles and De La Salle Lady Spikers played a volleyball match, dubbed "The Battle of the Rivals", in reference to their rivalry being noted as the well known rivalry in Philippine sports. Different generations of the teams between Season 74 to Season 78 came together to play against each other, and proceeds of the game would go to each school's charity foundation, and Rebisco Foundation Inc.

Announced on December 9, 2017, the Philippines, along with Japan and Indonesia, will co-host the 2023 FIBA Basketball World Cup, with the SM Mall of Asia Arena, along with other venues, hosting matches. The Mall of Asia Arena hosted several 2019 and 2023 FIBA Basketball World Cup Asian Qualifiers games of the Philippines.

The arena hosted Tanduay Alab Pilipinas' first game of the 2017–18 ABL season. It was the first time that Alab played in an arena as large as the Mall of Asia Arena, and the first ABL game in the arena.

The arena also hosted the Maharlika Pilipinas Basketball League All-Stars on March 2, 2019, where the Southern All-Stars prevailed over the Northern All-Stars, 109–84.

The basketball (5v5) tournament of the 2019 Southeast Asian Games was held at the arena.

The 2021 MPBL Invitational tournament was held at the arena from December 11–23, and the first to allow live audience since the COVID-19 pandemic in a 50% capacity.

Esports
From June 7–12, 2016, the arena held a professional Dota 2 eSports tournament, known as the Manila Major 2016, which was hosted by Valve and produced by PGL eSports. The Manila Major is the third event of Valve's Dota Major Championships where 16 international teams competed.

On August 18–19, 2018, a Regional League of Legends Tournament took place, known as The Globe Conquerors Manila. The Winner will have a chance to represent Southeast Asia at The League of Legends World Championship.

Religious events
The SM Mall of Asia Arena served as the main venue for the Encounter with the Families event, led by Pope Francis during his papal visit to the Philippines on January 16, 2015. The event was a dialogue between Pope Francis and an audience of families. The arena also hosted Bo Sanchez's Kerygma Conference (now Feast Conference) in 2012 and annually from 2014 to 2019.

The arena also hosted several events of various churches, including Victory Christian Fellowship. In 2019, the Jesus Global Youth Day was also held at the arena. In September 2022, Australian Christian worship band Planetshakers performed at the arena in their first event in the Philippines since January 2020.

On December 9, 2016, Ang Dating Daan'' celebrated its 36th broadcast anniversary at the arena with a Special Worldwide Bible Exposition.

Other uses
On December 30, 2014, the SM Mall of Asia Arena served as the venue for the wedding reception of GMA Network actors Dingdong Dantes and Marian Rivera.

On November 18, 2015, the arena served as the venue for the welcome dinner hosted by then-President Benigno Aquino III for the visiting economic leaders (mostly heads of government) participating at the APEC Economic Leaders' Meeting.

The Autism Society of the Philippines held the Angels Walk for Autism every year, and the parade starting from the Coral Way and ending at the MOA Music Hall.

Amidst the COVID-19 pandemic in the Philippines, the SM Mall of Asia Arena was converted into a mega swabbing center with 72 testing booths and opened on May 11, 2020.

See also

SM Mall of Asia
Seaside City Arena

References

External links

Arena
Sports venues in Metro Manila
Indoor arenas in the Philippines
Basketball venues in the Philippines
Buildings and structures in Pasay
Tennis venues in the Philippines
Volleyball venues in the Philippines
International Premier Tennis League
Arquitectonica buildings